Tomb paintings of Sindh are found mainly in the Shahdadkot tehsil of Qamber-Shahdadkot in Sindh, Pakistan.

During the Kalhora period (1680–1784 AD) wall paintings became common. They often depicted folk tales, scenes from rustic life, the  tribal chiefs and their battles.

The Jamali tombs Larkana and Qamber-Shahdadkot, are famous for the paintings, which depict the  romances of Sassui Punnhun, Momal Rano, Suhni Mehar, Layla and Majnun and Noori Jam Tamachi.

See also
 Sindhi folk tales

References

External links
 History of Kalhoras

Indian folk art
Pakistani art
Indian painting
Pakistani paintings
Sindhi folklore